Michael James Simpkins (born 28 November 1978) English footballer who plays for Belper Town. A defender by trade, Simpkins was primarily a left back but now plays in the more familiar role of central defender.

Career
He began his professional career at Chesterfield after progressing through the youth team. In 2001, he moved on to Cardiff City but failed to make a significant impact on the first team at Ninian Park and had loan spells at Exeter City and Cheltenham Town.

He moved on to Rochdale in 2003 on a two-year contract. He was the regular left back for manager Alan Buckley. However, he was quickly dropped by new manager Steve Parkin and persuaded to leave in the summer of 2004. He dropped into non-League football, signing for Conference National side Burton Albion, making 20 appearances in the 2004–05 season, before moving to league rivals Leigh RMI in March 2005, but he could not prevent Leigh's relegation at the end of the season.

Simpkins then moved closer to his native Sheffield by linking up with Worksop Town ahead of the 2005–06 season, and spent just over a year with the Tigers, establishing himself as a first-team regular; however, due to his poor disciplinary record, he was released early in the 2006–07 season after a sending-off against Vauxhall Motors. Simpkins then signed for Buxton, but left the club after a change of heart very soon afterwards and instead joined Grantham Town. He was named captain of the Gingerbreads and his impressive form for the Lincolnshire side earned a transfer bid from Conference North outfit Worcester City, but he declined the offer due to travelling concerns.

Budget cuts at Grantham forced Simpkins' departure in January 2008. He later signed for Retford United. Simpkins stayed with Retford in their successful title-winning side of 2007–08 and has agreed to stay with the club for the 2008–09 season.

He subsequently moved to Worksop Town where he became club captain

In the summer of 2011 he moved to Frickley Athletic before joining Belper Town in October 2011.

External links

1978 births
Living people
Footballers from Sheffield
English footballers
Association football defenders
Sheffield Wednesday F.C. players
Chesterfield F.C. players
Cardiff City F.C. players
Exeter City F.C. players
Cheltenham Town F.C. players
Rochdale A.F.C. players
Burton Albion F.C. players
Alfreton Town F.C. players
Leigh Genesis F.C. players
Worksop Town F.C. players
Buxton F.C. players
Grantham Town F.C. players
Retford United F.C. players
Frickley Athletic F.C. players
Belper Town F.C. players
English Football League players
Northern Premier League players